Wyatt Rainey Blassingame (February 6, 1909 – 1985), also known as W. B. Rainey, was an American writer and the author of many short stories and articles for national magazines, four adult novels and dozens of juvenile nonfiction books.

Early years 
Blassingame was born in Demopolis, Alabama, on February 6, 1909, to Wyatt Childs Blassingame and Maude Lurton Blassingame.  He was educated at Howard College, now Samford University, in Birmingham, Alabama, the University of Alabama, and New York University, graduating in 1952. He served in the United States Navy during World War II and received a Bronze Star and a Presidential Unit Citation. After moving to Anna Maria, Florida, he taught at Manatee Junior College and Florida Southern College.

Career 
In the 1930s, Blassingame wrote for the "Weird menace" horror pulps such as Terror Tales and Dime Mystery.  His short stories have recently been republished in three collections edited by John Pelan, published by Dancing Tuatara Press. Four of his juvenile nonfiction books were written for the Landmark book series: The French Foreign Legion, The U.S. Frogmen of World War II, Combat Nurses of World War II, and Medical Corps Heroes of World War II. Blassingame made every effort to make his books as accurate as possible, and disapproved of fictionalizing juvenile history merely for the benefit of drama. Many of his books were chosen as Junior Book-of-the-Month selections, Junior Literary Guild selections and other honors.

Death 
He died in his Florida home in 1985.

Family 
He married Gertrude Olsen in 1936 and had two daughters, Peggy and April.

References

External links
 Wyatt Rainey Blassingame Papers at the University of South Florida

20th-century American novelists
20th-century American male writers
American horror writers
Novelists from Alabama
People from Demopolis, Alabama
1909 births
1985 deaths
American male novelists
American male short story writers
20th-century American short story writers
People from Anna Maria, Florida